Ernest Bevin Academy is a secondary school for boys and a mixed sixth form located in Tooting, London, England. The school is all-boys for ages 11 through 18, and has a co-educational sixth form.  It has about 1,173 pupils. The school was judged as 'requiring improvement' in a November 2018 report by Ofsted. The school was judged as "Good" in a June 2022 report by Ofsted.

History
The school was named after Ernest Bevin (1881–1951), a British labour leader and politician. It was formed through merging the two adjacent schools of Bec Grammar and Hillcroft Secondary Modern in 1971. The school was briefly named Bec-Hillcroft until 1971 when it became Ernest Bevin School. It was renamed Ernest Bevin College in 1996 . 

Hillcroft Secondary School, Bec-Hillcroft and Ernest Bevin School ran under the aegis of the Inner London Education Authority until it was abolished by the Education Reform Act 1988. Since then the school has been run by the London Borough of Wandsworth.  

Ernest Bevin College became a specialist college for athletics since 2000. Because of improvement in academic achievement, the college was offered a second specialism in Mathematics and Computing in 2004.

On the 1st of March 2023, Ernest Bevin College became a part of the United Learning Trust, with the new name 'Ernest Bevin Academy'.

Sports at Ernest Bevin 
Sports the school currently participates in, or facilitates students' participation in, include: Football, Rugby, Cricket, Swimming, Athletics, Basketball, Table tennis.

Ernest Bevin has won many tournaments in volleyball like the U16 Boys Nationals Title (2008). They were succeeded by Newcastle (Staffs) Volleyball Club in 2009.

Judo was one of the four focus sports at Ernest Bevin College and students are offered many opportunities to participate in the sport. The Judo team is licensed by British Judo Association and is called Ernest Bevin Phoenix Judo Club.

Notable former pupils
Eric Boateng, college basketball player
Mike Bowron, Former commissioner for City of London Police
Sean Davis, professional footballer
Ortis Deley, television presenter, radio DJ and actor
Marvin Elliott, professional footballer
Winston Gordon, judo competitor
Lennie James, actor and playwright
Joe Joyce, boxer and Olympic medalist
Sadiq Khan, Labour MP for Tooting and Mayor of London.
Alan Knight, professional football goalkeeper
Mad Professor, music producer
Tony Meo, professional snooker player
Jimmy White, professional snooker player

References

External links 
 
 Ofsted reports – Ernest Bevin College (archive)

Boys' schools in London
Secondary schools in the London Borough of Wandsworth
Academies in the London Borough of Wandsworth